Major-General Francis James Marshall  (20 August 1876 – 22 May 1942) was a British Army officer.

Military career
Marshall was commissioned into the Seaforth Highlanders on 28 September 1895. He became commander of 150th (York and Durham) Brigade in June 1918 and General Officer Commanding 52nd (Lowland) Infantry Division in September 1918 on the Western Front during the First World War. He went on to be Director of Military Training at the War Office in 1920, commander of the 11th Infantry Brigade in October 1923 and General Officer Commanding 54th (East Anglian) Infantry Division in September 1930 before retiring in September 1934.

He was appointed a Companion of the Order of St Michael and St George in the 1918 New Year Honours.

References

|-

1876 births
1942 deaths
British Army major generals
British Army generals of World War I
Companions of the Order of the Bath
Companions of the Order of St Michael and St George
Companions of the Distinguished Service Order
Seaforth Highlanders officers